The Bridal Veil Falls is a cascade waterfall on the Leura Falls Creek where it spills into the Jamison Valley, located south-east of  in the Blue Mountains region of New South Wales, Australia.

The falls are located downstream of the Leura Cascades and can be easily accessed from Leura via a short walking track that is part of the Federal Pass, one of the heritage-listed Blue Mountains walking tracks.

See also 

List of waterfalls in New South Wales
Blue Mountains walking tracks

References 

Waterfalls of the Blue Mountains
Cascade waterfalls